Transversotrema giganticum is a species of trematodes found in scarids on Heron Island and Lizard Island. It is characterised by its number of vitelline follicles enclosed by its cyclocoel and by the size of its testicle.

References

Further reading
Bray, Rodney A., and Thomas H. Cribb. "Are cryptic species a problem for parasitological biological tagging for stock identification of aquatic organisms?." Parasitology 142.01 (2015): 125–133.
Blasco-Costa, Isabel, et al. "Molecular approaches to trematode systematics:‘best practice’and implications for future study." Systematic parasitology 93.3 (2016): 295–306.

External links

Plagiorchiida
Trematodes parasiting fish
Animals described in 2010